Hari Narke (born 1 June 1963) is an Indian scholar, author and orator. He is serving as professor and Head of Mahatma Phule Chair, in the University of Pune.

Early life
Narke was born on 1 June 1963 in Ramchandra Narke and mother Sonabai Narke a very poor Mali caste family at Talegaon Dhamdhere, Tal. Shirur, Dist. Pune, Maharashtra, India. Narke's education was mostly in Pune. He has completed his education by working in a graveyard. He is married to Sangita. They have a daughter Pramiti.

Publications
Narke has written or edited 35 books on various issues, but most notably on "Mahatma" Jotirao Phule and the Dalit movement of B. R. Ambedkar.

Marathi
 Mahatma Phule yanchi Badnaami : Ek Satyashodhan
 Jnyanajyoti Savitribai Phule  (second edition)
 OBC chya Bhavitavyavar Kurhad
 Dalit Sahityachya Shodhat (Published at the hands of the then President of India  K.R. Narayanan)
 Mahatma Phule Shodhachya Navya Vata (Fifth edition)

Hindi
 Mahatma Phule Sahitya aur Vichaar - Published at the hands of the then President of India, Dr. Shankar Dayal Sharma
 Mahatma Phule Samasta Sahitya - Vols. 1 to 4

English
 Editor of Dr. Babasaheb Ambedkar : Writings and Speeches, Vols. 17 to 22
 Collected Works of Mahatma Phule, Vols. 1 to 3

Speeches
Hari Narke has delivered 6,000 lectures in the last 30 years, including lectures at London, Birmingham, Manchester, Bedford, Dubai, Sharjah, Abu Dhabi, Al-ain, Kathmandu, and Lumbini.

TV series
 The TV serials Dr. Babasaheb Ambedkar: Mahamanvachi Gauravgatha and Ek Mahanayak: Dr. B. R. Ambedkar are based on Hari Narake's research.

Other offices
 Member-Secretary of Mahatma Phule Source Material Publication Committee, Govt. of Maharashtra, Mantralaya, Mumbai.
 Member of Maharashtra State Commission for backward classes.

References

External links
 प्रा. हरी नरके

Living people
1963 births
People from Talegaon